Prairie bundleflower is a common name for several plants and may refer to:

Desmanthus illinoensis
Desmanthus leptolobus, native to North America